Great Lakes Brewing Company is a brewery and brewpub in Cleveland, Ohio. The first brewpub and microbrewery in the state, Great Lakes Brewing has been noted as important to Cleveland's local identity and as one of the initial forces behind the revival of the Ohio City neighborhood on the near West Side. In 2015, it was the 21st-largest craft brewery by volume and the 28th-largest overall brewery in the United States.
The company was established in 1988 by brothers Patrick and Daniel Conway, both St. Edward High School graduates, in Cleveland's Ohio City neighborhood, located near St. Ignatius High School and the West Side Market. The brewpub and restaurant remain in their original locations, while production has expanded to adjacent properties.

The present site allows visitors to enjoy a glass of beer in the original brewpub which features a Tiger Mahogany bar from the 1860s, a Beer Cellar and the Rockefeller Room, named after Standard Oil founder and Clevelander John D. Rockefeller, who was thought to have worked in the building. There is a gift shop selling beer, along with apparel and barware. Tours are available on the weekends. Since its inception, Great Lakes has also served as an incubator for Northeast Ohio brewers, with brewmasters at nearby Market Garden and Goldhorn Brewery in the St. Clair-Superior neighborhood both being alumni of Great Lakes.

Distribution
As of 2021, Great Lakes' products are heavily distributed in Cleveland and Northeast Ohio.

Beers

Year-round

Seasonal

Imperial IPA series
Introduced in 2021, GLBC's Imperial IPA series consists of five premium quality, high-alcohol content (minimum 8.0% ABV) imperial IPAs.

Variety packs
A 12-bottle variety pack containing three bottles each of Dortmunder Gold Lager, Eliot Ness Amber Lager, Commodore Perry IPA, and Edmund Fitzgerald Porter is available year-round. A 15-can "Gimme Five!" variety pack containing three cans each of Dortmunder Gold Lager, TropiCoastal Tropical IPA, Hazecraft IPA, and three cans each of two seasonal beers (January through April: Burning River Pale Ale and Crushworthy Lo-Cal Citrus Wheat; May through August: Watermelon Crushworthy and Mexican Lager with Lime; September through December: Cranberry Orange Wheat and Edmund Fitzgerald Porter) is also available.

A "Hop Madness" IPA variety pack containing three cans each of Vibacious Double IPA, TropiCoastal Tropical IPA, Hazecraft IPA, and a variety pack exclusive Small Batch Hazy IPA was released in March 2023.

Pub exclusives

GLBC brews many beers which are only available at their brewpub and restaurant. In some instances, beers that were formerly available throughout the brewery's distribution footprint (e.g., Holy Moses White Ale, Turntable Pils) are withdrawn from wide circulation and made available only at the brewpub.

Sustainability
Great Lakes Brewing Company has undertaken a number of initiatives to promote sustainability, including recycling promotional materials to create fuel for heating an outdoor structure, the use of straw-bale construction (incidentally the first straw-bale structure in Cleveland), the composting of leftovers from the brewery's restaurant, and the use of local and organic food.  The brewery also provides barley left over from the brewing process to local farmers for use as feed and to local bakers who use it to produce bread and pretzels.  In addition, the delivery trucks are equipped to use biodiesel and are fueled with left-over vegetable oil from the restaurant. The brewery uses solar panels placed on the roof to preheat the water they use to brew beer. And during the colder months, they use outside air for cooling, rather than conventional refrigeration units.  The organization is growing, with 5800 members in 2008.

Great Lakes Brewing Company also hosts the meetings of Entrepreneurs for Sustainability, a business network in the Greater Cleveland area focusing on sustainability and entrepreneurship.  The brewery has set up displays at a number of sustainability-oriented events, including a 2006 "greener living fair" at Ohio State University, and the "green pavilion" of the 2009 Cleveland Home and Garden Show at the I-X Center.

Sports affiliations
GLBC has been the official craft brewery of the Cleveland Indians/Guardians of Major League Baseball (MLB) since 2019, and of the Cleveland Cavaliers of the National Basketball Association (NBA) since 2022.

References

External links

 

Companies based in Cleveland
Beer brewing companies based in Ohio
Culture of Cleveland
Ohio City, Cleveland
1988 establishments in Ohio
Food and drink companies established in 1988
American companies established in 1988